Quiapo may refer to:

Quiapo, Chile, a location in Arauco Province
Quiapo, Manila, a district in the Philippines
 Quiapo Church